{{DISPLAYTITLE:C14H19NO4}}
The molecular formula C14H19NO4 (molar mass: 265.31 g/mol, exact mass: 265.1314 u) may refer to:

 Anisomycin, also known as flagecidin
 Filenadol

Molecular formulas